Iniyavale is a 1998 Tamil-language drama film directed by Seeman. The film stars Prabhu, Gautami, Suvalakshmi and Keerthi Reddy. It was released on 15 May 1998. The film marks Thamarai debut in Tamil cinema.

Plot 

Prabhakaran (Prabhu), a poet, lives with his mother and his father. Prabhakaran has two friends Raja (Raja) and Murugan (Vadivelu) who are like his own brothers. A classical dancer (Gautami) admires his poems. His ambition is passing the IAS exams and becoming a collector at all costs before the marriage. Prabhakaran's father (T. S. B. K. Moulee) and Ramanathan (Raghuvaran), Meena's father, are close friends and they decide to get Prabhakaran and Meena (Suvalakshmi) married. Meena is a very sensitive girl. Prabhakaran cannot accept and tries to cancel the marriage whereas Meena falls in love with her future groom Prabhakaran. Prabhakaran refuses for the marriage as a consequence Meena commits suicide because of a misinterpretation. Meena's family blames the innocent Prabhakaran. He feels guilty and decides to marry Meena's younger sister Manju (Keerthi Reddy), a playful girl. What transpires later forms the crux of the story.

Cast 

Prabhu as Prabhakaran
Gautami as Dancer
Suvalakshmi as Meena
Keerthi Reddy as Manju
Raghuvaran as Ramanathan
T. S. B. K. Moulee as Prabhakaran's father
Vadivelu as Murugan
Raja as Raja
Lakshmi as Lakshmi, Prabhakaran's mother
Kalaranjini as Ramanathan's wife
Devan as Meena and Manju's uncle
Jai Ganesh as Shanmugam
Mohan V. Ram
Venu Arvind
Halwa Vasu as Perumal
Hemalatha as Rani

Production 
Malayalam actress Manju Warrier was initially attached to the project but later opted out. Kausalya was expected to replace her, though later Suvaluxmi was cast.

The cancellation of Prabhu's other film Nanba Nanba meant that he was able to clear his schedule to shoot for Iniyavale during March 1998.

Soundtrack 

The film score and the soundtrack were composed by Deva, with lyrics written by Seeman, Arivumathi, Jeevan, Punniyar and Thamarai.

References 

1990s Tamil-language films
1998 films
Films directed by Seeman
Films scored by Deva (composer)
Indian drama films